Taguhi Ararat Ghazaryan (16 March 1991) is an Armenian literary critic and politician for the Civil Contract party, who has been a member of the National Assembly since the 2018 parliamentary elections.

References 

Living people
1991 births
21st-century Armenian women politicians
21st-century Armenian politicians
Yerevan State University alumni
Members of the National Assembly (Armenia)
Members of the 7th convocation of the National Assembly (Armenia)